"Million Pound Girl (Badder Than Bad)" is a single by English-Ghanaian recording artist Fuse ODG. The song was released in the United Kingdom as a digital download on 29 December 2013. The song debuted at number 14 on the UK Singles Chart, and peaked at number 5 the following week. It debuted at number 22 on the Scottish Singles Chart, peaking at number 11 the following week, and also reached number 65 on the Irish Singles Chart.

Music video
A music video to accompany the release of "Million Pound Girl (Badder Than Bad)" was first released onto YouTube on 17 October 2013 at a total length of four minutes and thirty seconds.

Track listings

Chart performance

Weekly charts

Year-end charts

Certifications

Release history

References

2013 singles
2013 songs
Fuse ODG songs